Sidney Newey (5 March 1899 - 9 July 1966) was a British athlete who competed at the 1924 Summer Olympics.

References

1899 births
1966 deaths
Athletes (track and field) at the 1924 Summer Olympics
British male steeplechase runners
Olympic athletes of Great Britain